Connecticut Route 80 is a 25.9 mile highway that runs through south-central Connecticut. The west end is at CT 17 in Quinnipiac Meadows neighborhood of New Haven, and the east end is at CT 154 in Deep River. Route 80 runs within 5 miles of many town squares- including Downtown New Haven.

Route description
Route 80 begins at the junction of I-91 and Route 17 in New Haven (at exit 8). Route 17 splits off and heads northward right after the exit. Route 80 begins as a 4-lane principal arterial road in New Haven, continuing due east for almost its entire length. It has a junction with the southern end of Route 103 before entering East Haven.  It then passes the north end of Route 100 before crossing into North Branford.  In North Branford, it has a  overlap with Route 22, during which it meets the north end of Route 139.  Just east of the Route 22 concurrency, Route 80 becomes a 2 lane minor rural arterial road and enters Guilford.  It crosses Route 77 in North Guilford before entering Madison.  In the village of North Madison, it meets Route 79 at a roundabout.  It then enters Killingworth, where it passes Chatfield Hollow State Park and intersects with Route 81 at a traffic circle in the center of town.  After crossing into Deep River, it briefly overlaps with Route 145, then meets Route 9 at exit 5 about  before its terminus at Route 154.

Route 80 crosses over the Hammonasset River between Madison and Killingworth on Bridge No. 1132, a historic open-spandrel arch bridge built by the Connecticut Highway Department in 1934.

History 

In 1818, a toll road was chartered running from the Boston Post Road at the Guilford-Madison town line northeast through Killingworth center, then east to Deep River, ending at the Middlesex Turnpike. The turnpike, known as the Pettipauge and Guilford Turnpike, used Green Hill Road in Madison and Killingworth then modern Route 80 to Deep River. In 1824, another turnpike was built, beginning in the Fair Haven section of New Haven, heading eastward along modern Route 80, and ending at the Pettipauge and Guilford Turnpike in Killingworth center. This was known as the Fairhaven Turnpike.

In 1922, when Connecticut first publicly signed its state highways with route numbers, several new numbered routes where created from these two turnpikes. From Fair Haven to North Branford center, State Highway 135 was created. Old Highway 135 continued south from North Branford center along modern Route 139 to the Boston Post Road. The eastward continuation of the old Fairhaven Turnpike between North Branford center and the village of North Guilford was designated as State Highway 140. The portion of the old Pettipaue and Guilford Turnpike between Killingworth center and Deep River center became State Highway 175. 

Modern Route 80 was established as part of the 1932 state highway renumbering from old highways 175, 140, and the east–west portion of 135. In 1940, its east end was relocated to US 1 in Old Saybrook along Warsaw Street, Main Street, Middlesex Turnpike, and Essex Road. In the 1950s, it was extended west to Route 10 in New Haven along Middletown Avenue, State Street, Edwards Street, Munson Street, and Henry Street to Route 10 (Sherman Avenue). In 1962, the western end was truncated to its current location at Route 17. In 1966, with the opening of Route 9, the eastern end of Route 80 was truncated and rerouted to its current location.

Junction list

References

External links

080
Transportation in New Haven County, Connecticut
Transportation in Middlesex County, Connecticut